Xolani Maholo (born 21 November 1996) is a South African soccer player who plays as a midfielder.

Early life
Maholo was born in New Brighton, near Port Elizabeth.

Career
Having previously played for their reserve side, Maholo joined Chippa United's senior team at the start of the 2017–18 season, with him signing his first professional contract in September 2017. He made his debut for Chippa United in a 2–0 victory against AmaZulu on 7 January 2018.

He joined TS Galaxy during the 2020–21 season was released by TS Galaxy in summer 2021, after 1 appearance for the club.

References

Living people
1996 births
South African soccer players
People from New Brighton, Eastern Cape
Soccer players from the Eastern Cape
Association football midfielders
Chippa United F.C. players
TS Galaxy F.C. players
South African Premier Division players